In mathematics, a rational function is any function that can be defined by a rational fraction, which is an algebraic fraction such that both the numerator and the denominator are polynomials. The coefficients of the polynomials need not be rational numbers; they may be taken in any field K. In this case, one speaks of a rational function and a rational fraction over K. The values of the variables may be taken in any field L containing K. Then the domain of the function is the set of the values of the variables for which the denominator is not zero, and the codomain is L.

The set of rational functions over a field K is a field, the field of fractions of the ring of the polynomial functions over K.

Definitions
A function  is called a rational function if and only if it can be written in the form

However, if  and  have a non-constant polynomial greatest common divisor , then setting  and  produces a rational function

Degree
There are several non equivalent definitions of the degree of a rational function.

In the case of complex coefficients, a rational function with degree one is a Möbius transformation.

The degree of the graph of a rational function is not the degree as defined above: it is the maximum of the degree of the numerator and one plus the degree of the denominator.

In some contexts, such as in asymptotic analysis, the degree of a rational function is the difference between the degrees of the numerator and the denominator.

Examples

The rational function

is not defined at

The rational function

which is undefined.

A constant function such as f(x) = π is a rational function since constants are polynomials. The function itself is rational, even though the value of f(x) is irrational for all x.

However, the adjective "irrational" is not generally used for functions.

The rational function  is equal to 1 for all x except 0, where there is a removable singularity. The sum, product, or quotient (excepting division by the zero polynomial) of two rational functions is itself a rational function. However, the process of reduction to standard form may inadvertently result in the removal of such singularities unless care is taken. Using the definition of rational functions as equivalence classes gets around this, since x/x is equivalent to 1/1.

Taylor series
The coefficients of a Taylor series of any rational function satisfy a linear recurrence relation, which can be found by equating the rational function to a Taylor series with indeterminate coefficients, and collecting like terms after clearing the denominator.

For example,

Multiplying through by the denominator and distributing,

After adjusting the indices of the sums to get the same powers of x, we get

Combining like terms gives

Since this holds true for all x in the radius of convergence of the original Taylor series, we can compute as follows.  Since the constant term on the left must equal the constant term on the right it follows that

Then, since there are no powers of x on the left, all of the coefficients on the right must be zero, from which it follows that

Conversely, any sequence that satisfies a linear recurrence determines a rational function when used as the coefficients of a Taylor series. This is useful in solving such recurrences, since by using partial fraction decomposition we can write any proper rational function as a sum of factors of the form  and expand these as geometric series, giving an explicit formula for the Taylor coefficients; this is the method of generating functions.

Abstract algebra and geometric notion 
In abstract algebra the concept of a polynomial is extended to include formal expressions in which the coefficients of the polynomial can be taken from any field.  In this setting given a field F and some indeterminate X, a rational expression is any element of the field of fractions of the polynomial ring F[X].  Any rational expression can be written as the quotient of two polynomials P/Q with Q ≠ 0, although this representation isn't unique.  P/Q is equivalent to R/S, for polynomials P, Q, R, and S, when PS = QR.  However, since F[X] is a unique factorization domain, there is a unique representation for any rational expression P/Q with P and Q polynomials of lowest degree and Q chosen to be monic.  This is similar to how a fraction of integers can always be written uniquely in lowest terms by canceling out common factors.

The field of rational expressions is denoted F(X). This field is said to be generated (as a field) over F by (a transcendental element) X, because F(X) does not contain any proper subfield containing both F and the element X.

Complex rational functions

In complex analysis, a rational function

Every rational function can be naturally extended to a function whose domain and range are the whole Riemann sphere (complex projective line).

Rational functions are representative examples of meromorphic functions.

Iteration of rational functions (maps) on the Riemann sphere creates discrete dynamical systems.

Notion of a rational function on an algebraic variety 

Like polynomials, rational expressions can also be generalized to n indeterminates X1,..., Xn, by taking the field of fractions of F[X1,..., Xn], which is denoted by F(X1,..., Xn).

An extended version of the abstract idea of rational function is used in algebraic geometry. There the function field of an algebraic variety V is formed as the field of fractions of the coordinate ring of V (more accurately said, of a Zariski-dense affine open set in V). Its elements f are considered as regular functions in the sense of algebraic geometry on non-empty open sets U, and also may be seen as morphisms to the projective line.

Applications
Rational functions are used in numerical analysis for interpolation and approximation of functions, for example the Padé approximations introduced by Henri Padé. Approximations in terms of rational functions are well suited for computer algebra systems and other numerical software. Like polynomials, they can be evaluated straightforwardly, and at the same time they express more diverse behavior than polynomials. 

Rational functions are used to approximate or model more complex equations in science and engineering including fields and forces in physics, spectroscopy in analytical chemistry, enzyme kinetics in biochemistry, electronic circuitry, aerodynamics, medicine concentrations in vivo, wave functions for atoms and molecules, optics and photography to improve image resolution, and acoustics and sound.

In signal processing, the Laplace transform (for continuous systems) or the z-transform (for discrete-time systems) of the impulse response of commonly-used linear time-invariant systems (filters) with infinite impulse response are rational functions over complex numbers.

See also
 Field of fractions
 Partial fraction decomposition
 Partial fractions in integration
 Function field of an algebraic variety
 Algebraic fractionsa generalization of rational functions that allows taking integer roots

References

External links
 Dynamic visualization of rational functions with JSXGraph

Algebraic varieties
Morphisms of schemes
Meromorphic functions